The Brisingidae are a family of starfish found only in the deep sea. They inhabit both the Atlantic and Pacific Oceans at abyssal depths, and also occur in the Southern Ocean and around Antarctica at slightly shallower depths.

The family was named after Brísingamen, a necklace belonging to Freya from Norse mythology that was stolen by Loki and hidden in the sea.

Characteristics

Members of this family have a small, Ophiurida-like disc, clearly demarcated from the arms, which number more than five. The disc is approximately circular with a rim of fused plates which gives rigidity. The madreporite is near the margin of the disc. The arms are long and tapering with the ratio of the arm length to the disc radius being greater than 6/1. There is an acute angle between them and they can be shed at the base where they are separated from the disc by a deep groove. After a narrow cylindrical portion, the part of the arms closest to the disc accommodates the gonadal tissues and widens out somewhat. Beyond this area, the arms taper to a long point. The plates on the aboral (upper) side of the arms are small, and are much smaller than the marginal plates, which are armed with spines. The ambulacral groove on the underside of each arm is broad and there is a row of tube feet with suckers on either side of the groove. The pedicellariae are crossed.

Biology
They raise their arms vertically above their discs to filter feed on suspended organic particles drifting past. They are able to raise their arms in this way because of the small size of its plates on the aboral surfaces of their arms which gives them flexibility in a vertical plane. Novodinia is less adept at raising its arms, because of a different arrangement of the plates; in contrast, members of the other brisingid family, Freyellidae, have not been detected raising their arms in this way.

Genera and species
Brisingidae contains the following genera and species: 

Astrolirus Fisher, 1917
Astrolirus panamensis (Ludwig, 1905)
Astrolirus patricki Zhang, Zhou, Xiao & Wang, 2020
Astrostephane Fisher, 1917
 Astrostephane acanthogenys (Fisher, 1916)
 Astrostephane moluccana (Fisher, 1916)
Brisinga Asbjørnsen, 1856
 Brisinga alberti Fisher, 1907
 Brisinga analoga (Fisher, 1919)
 Brisinga andamanica Wood-Mason & Alcock, 1891
 Brisinga bengalensis Wood-Mason & Alcock, 1891
 Brisinga chathamica McKnight, 1973
 Brisinga costata Verrill, 1884
 Brisinga cricophora Sladen, 1889
 Brisinga distincta Sladen, 1889
 Brisinga endecacnemos Asbjørnsen, 1856
 Brisinga eucoryne Fisher, 1916
 Brisinga evermanni Fisher, 1906
 Brisinga gunnii Alcock, 1893
 Brisinga hirsuta Perrier, 1894
 Brisinga insularum Wood-Mason & Alcock, 1891
 Brisinga panopla Fisher, 1906
 Brisinga parallela Koehler, 1909
 Brisinga synaptoma (Fisher, 1917)
 Brisinga tasmani H.E.S. Clark, 1970
 Brisinga trachydisca Fisher, 1916
 Brisinga variispina Ludwig, 1905
Brisingaster Loriol, 1883
 Brisingaster robillardi de Loriol, 1883
Brisingella Fisher, 1917
 Brisingella verticillata (Sladen, 1889)
Brisingenes Fisher, 1917
 Brisingenes anchista Fisher, 1919
 Brisingenes mimica (Fisher, 1916)
 Brisingenes multicostata (Verrill, 1894)
 Brisingenes plurispinula Aziz & Jangoux, 1985
Hymenodiscus Perrier, 1884
 Hymenodiscus agassizi (Perrier, 1882)
 Hymenodiscus aotearoa (McKnight, 1973)
 Hymenodiscus armillata (Sladen, 1889)
 Hymenodiscus beringiana (Korovchinsky, 1967)
 Hymenodiscus coronata (Sars G.O., 1872)
 Hymenodiscus distincta (Sladen, 1889)
 Hymenodiscus exilis (Fisher, 1905)
 Hymenodiscus fragilis (Fisher, 1906)
 Hymenodiscus membranacea (Sladen, 1889)
 Hymenodiscus monacantha H.L. Clark, 1920
 Hymenodiscus ochotensis Djakonov 1950
 Hymenodiscus pannychia Fisher, 1928
 Hymenodiscus pusilla Fisher, 1917
 Hymenodiscus submembranacea (Doderlein, 1927)
 Hymenodiscus tenella (Luwig, 1905)
 Hymenodiscus verticellata (Sladen, 1889)
Labidiaster Lütken, 1872 
Midgardia Downey, 1972
 Midgardia xandaros Downey, 1972
Novodinia Dartnall, Pawson, Pope & B.J. Smith, 1969
 Novodinia americana (Verrill, 1880)
 Novodinia antillensis (A.H.Clark, 1934)
 Novodinia austini (Koehler, 1909)
 Novodinia australis (H.L. Clark, 1916)
 Novodinia clarki (Koehler, 1909)
 Novodinia homonyma Downey, 1986
 Novodinia magister Fisher, 1917
 Novodinia novaezelandiae (H.E.S. Clark, 1962)
 Novodinia pacifica (Fisher, 1906)
 Novodinia pandina (Sladen, 1889)
 Novodinia penichra (Fisher, 1916)
 Novodinia radiata Aziz & Jangoux, 1985
 Novodinia semicoronata (Perrier, 1885)
Odinella Fisher, 1940
Odinella nutrix Fisher, 1940
Stegnobrisinga Fisher, 1916
Stegnobrisinga gracilis (Koehler, 1909)
Stegnobrisinga placoderma Fisher, 1916
Stegnobrisinga splendens H.L. Clark, 1926

References

Brisingida
Echinoderm families